Fuglestad is a Norwegian surname. Notable people with the surname include:

Erik Fuglestad (born 1974), Norwegian footballer and coach
Finn Fuglestad (born 1942), Norwegian historian

Norwegian-language surnames